

Musicians

Dewey Redman (1931–2006), American jazz tenor saxophonist
Don Redman (1900–1964), American jazz musician and composer
Joshua Redman (born 1969), prominent American jazz saxophonist
Matt Redman (born 1974), English Christian worship leader and songwriter
Michael Redman (singer) (born 1945), American singer
Mike Redman (born 1978), Dutch musician, record producer, film maker and label owner
Reginald Redman (1892–1972), British light music composer
Ryan Redman, member of Exit Ten, a British metal band

Athletes

Billy Redman (1928–1994), English footballer
Brian Redman (born 1937), English racing driver
Chris Redman (born 1977), American football quarterback
Doc Hudspeth Redman (born 1997), American professional golfer
Isaac Redman (born 1984), former American football running back
Jim Redman (cricketer) (1926–1981), English cricketer
Jim Redman (born 1931), English motorcycle road racer
Joel Redman (born 1987), English professional wrestler
Magdalen Redman (1930=2020), American professional baseball player
Mark Redman (born 1974), American professional baseball player
Michele Redman (born 1965), American professional golfer
Prentice Redman (born 1979), American professional baseball outfielder
Rick Redman (1943-2022), American football linebacker
Tike Redman, American professional baseball center fielder

Film and television
Amanda Redman (born 1957), English actress
Dean Redman, British born Canadian actor
Erich Redman, Russian-born German actor
Frank Redman (1901 – 1966), American cinematographer
Joyce Redman (1915–2012), Anglo-Irish actress
Layne Redman, British television presenter, writer and actor
Mark Redman, fictional character in British TV series Coronation Street
Stuart Redman, played by Gary Sinese, fictional character in television mini-series The Stand (adapted from Stephen King's novel with the same name)

Other
Jason Redman, former U.S. Navy SEAL
John Redman (Trinity College) (1499–1551), first Master of Trinity College, Cambridge
John Redman (physician) (1722–1808), first president of the College of Physicians of Philadelphia
Joseph Redman (1891–1968), admiral in the United States Navy
Karen Redman (born 1953), Canadian politician
Lawrence V. Redman (1880–1946), Canadian chemist
Leanne Redman, Australian-born American physiologist and expert on obesity
Lenn Redman (1912–1987), American cartoonist and animator
Michael Redman (politician) (born 1966), New Zealand businessman and politician
Monte N. Redman (born 1951), American company director
Roderick Oliver Redman British astronomer
Sally Redman, New Zealand-born Australian public health researcher
Tim Redman, former president of the U.S. Chess Federation

See also
Redman (disambiguation)
Redmann